Van Vleet or Vanvleet is a surname. Notable people with the surname include:

Fred VanVleet (born 1994), American basketball player
Louisa Van Vleet Spicer Wright (1862–1913), American physician
Mike Vanvleet (born 1970), American baseball umpire

See also
Lacy-Van Vleet House, historic house in Tompkins County, New York, United States
Lewis and Elizabeth Van Vleet House, historic house in Portland, Oregon, United States
Van Vleet, Mississippi
Van Fleet, surname

Surnames of Dutch origin